Bismarck State College (BSC) is a public college in Bismarck, North Dakota.  It is the third largest college in the North Dakota University System with 3,781 students as of September 2016.  Established in 1939, it is a comprehensive community college that offers the first two years of education toward a bachelor's degree in most fields as well as 20+ bachelor's degree and several undergraduate programs in conjunction with other university system institutions. Approximately 35 technical programs are offered and more than 150 courses are offered online. Unique to the institution are degrees in energy, including power and process plant technology, nuclear power technology, electric power technology, and renewable energy.

Student life
Student activities are managed by the staff of the Student and Residence Life Office, located in the Student Union building on campus. Students can register for meal plans, request housing, visit the bookstore, sign up for intramurals or student government, and learn about the activities provided for them on and off campus. Dances, hypnotists, comedians, artists, barbecues, and tie-dye are popular events.

Notable alumni
David Andahl, businessman and politician
Alvin Jaeger, 14th Secretary of State of North Dakota
Brock Lesnar, former WWE Champion and former UFC Heavyweight Champion
Bob Stenehjem, Republican member and Majority Leader of the North Dakota Senate
Masai Ujiri, general manager of the NBA's Toronto Raptors
Larry Watson, author of novels, poetry, and short stories

Notable faculty
Ed Kringstad - wrestling coach, North Dakota State Senator

Notes

External links
Official website

Community colleges in North Dakota
Bismarck–Mandan
Educational institutions established in 1939
Buildings and structures in Bismarck, North Dakota
Education in Burleigh County, North Dakota
1939 establishments in North Dakota
NJCAA athletics

Universities and colleges accredited by the Higher Learning Commission